Boxgrove Man is a name given to three fossils of early humans, found at Boxgrove in Sussex, and dated to about 480,000 years old.  One piece of the tibia (shinbone) and two teeth were found. The tibia was of a mature well-built man, perhaps from the common ancestor of modern humans of Neanderthals, and the teeth are thought to be of early Neanderthals. They are the oldest fossils of the genus homo found in Britain.

Fossils 
The site at Boxgrove in Sussex dates to the late Cromerian Stage, around 500,000 years ago, and it is the earliest site in Britain with fossils of the genus homo. The tibia was discovered in 1993 by archaeologist Mark Roberts and his team of the Institute of Archeology at University College London. The two teeth were found in 1995 and 1996 on returns to the site in the hope, which was realised, of finding further remains. The teeth were lower incisors found about a metre apart and are thought to belong to the same individual, a mature adult. The exceptional structural strength suggests a cold-adapted body with proportions paralleling those of the Neanderthals. Archaeological evidence indicates that these early humans had the ability to hunt or at least scavenge with stone tools as the team discovered hundreds of Acheulean flint tools at the site. The two teeth found show scratches, suggesting an eating technique in which food was cut with a tool whilst gripped between the jaws.

The site 
Boxgrove in this period evolved from coastal mudflats beneath chalk cliffs to a mosaic of habitats as the sea retreated. There were then areas of grassland, pools, scrub and woodland, with diverse prey and supplies of flint which made the area attractive to early humans. Prey included horse and probably deer. Other  mammal fossils were of extinct species of rhinoceros, bears, and voles. It is most likely that H. heidelbergensis hunted these animals for sustenance with the aid of the stone tools also discovered at this site. There is clear evidence on the animal remains that they were butchered, but it cannot be proven that the species whose fossil was found in association with them hunted these animals or scavenged them. Teeth marks on the tibia fossil may be evidence that he or she was scavenged as well, either by cannibalism or scavenging by another animal.

Comparative study
The discovery of the fossils of 29 individuals of a similar age at Sima de los Huesos in Spain has allowed scientists to gain a much greater understanding of the Boxgrove fossils by a comparative study in 2022. The tibia was found in a higher stratigraphical level than the teeth, and is unlikely to come from the same individual. The 2022 study has found that the teeth fit in the morphological range of the Sima de los huesos fossils, which have been identified by aDNA as early Neanderthals. The tibia falls outside the Sima de los huesos range, and would fit the last common ancestor of modern humans and Neanderthals. The Boxgrove fossils were dated to around 480,000 years ago.

See also 
Eartham Pit, Boxgrove

References 

Genetics in the United Kingdom
Homo heidelbergensis fossils
Prehistoric Britain
Pleistocene primates